David Lee Zurawik (born October 26, 1949) is an American journalist, author, and professor.
He has been the TV and media critic at The Baltimore Sun since 1989 and is an assistant professor of communications and media studies at Goucher College. Before that, Zurawik was a TV critic/columnist at the Dallas Times Herald. Zurawik is the author of The Jews of Prime Time.

Early life and education 
Zurawik was born to a Jewish family and earned a master's degree in specialized reporting from the University of Wisconsin–Madison and a doctorate in American studies from the University of Maryland, College Park. His dissertation in 2000 was titled The Jews of prime time: Ethnicity, self-censorship and assimilation in network television, 1949–1999. His doctoral advisor was Lawrence E. Mintz.

Career 
After completing graduate school, Zurawik first worked as a speech writer and press secretary for Wisconsin's Democratic lieutenant governor. He then worked as a reporter and critic for the Dallas Times Herald before joining The Baltimore Sun in 1989 as its television critic. His syndicated column runs in other newspapers, including the Los Angeles Times. In 2008, he became the lead writer for The Baltimore Sun TV blog, Z on TV. He has written pieces for the American Journalism Review. In 2017, he began writing articles for the Telegraph-Journal.

Zurawik worked for the Milwaukee Journal-Sentinel in the 1970s and the Detroit Free Press in the late-'70-s-early 80s, where he was a feature writer and TV critic.

Zurawik has been a guest on the CNN public affairs talk show Reliable Sources, and has also appeared on Fox News shows such as "Fox & Friends," "The O’Reilly Factor" and "On the Record with Greta Van Susteren."

In addition to his position with the Baltimore Sun, Zurawik is a communications and media studies assistant professor at Goucher College in Towson, Maryland.

He is also an editor for SAGE Publications.

Books 
Zurawik is the author of The Jews of Prime Time (2003). After that book was published, Zurawik reported that he was working on a biography of Gertrude Berg based on records stored at Syracuse University.

Awards and honors 
In 2015, Zurawik won the National Press Club's Arthur Rowse Award for Press Criticism in print.

Also in 2015, he was named a finalist in the Best Commentary category of the Mirror Awards, presented by Syracuse University's Newhouse School of Public Communications.

In 2016, he took home a first-place Excellence-in-Features award from the Society for Features Journalism in the Blog Portfolio category.

In 2017, he won another Arthur Rowse Award for press criticism, a National Press Club award.

In June 2017, he was given a third-place Arts & Entertainment award by the Society for Features Journalism.

In 2018, he won the Bart Richards Award for Media Criticism from Penn State University

Personal life 
Zurawik lives in Baltimore and has two brothers and a sister.

References

Further reading

External links 
 
 David Zurawik at Huffington Post
 

1949 births
The Baltimore Sun people
Writers from Baltimore
American political writers
American male journalists
Jewish American journalists
Writers from Dallas
American media critics
Writers from Milwaukee
Living people
University of Wisconsin–Madison School of Journalism & Mass Communication alumni
University of Maryland, College Park alumni
Journalists from Maryland
Journalists from Texas
Journalists from Wisconsin
Writers from Wisconsin
Goucher College faculty and staff
American television critics
20th-century American journalists
21st-century American journalists
21st-century American Jews